Wukong is Sun Wukong, the Monkey King in Chinese mythology.

Wukong may also refer to:

Named after Sun Wukong
 Dark Matter Particle Explorer, nicknamed Wukong, a Chinese satellite
 Sun Wukong Fossa, a fossa on Pluto
 Typhoon Wukong (disambiguation)
 Sun Wukong, fictional character from RWBY (see List of RWBY characters)
 Wukong, a playable character from Warframe
 Wu Kong (film), a 2017 Chinese film

Other
 Wukong (monk) (635–713), Chinese Buddhist monk